Amrakits formerly known as Nikolayevka and later as Kirov, is a village in the Lori Province of Armenia.

References

Populated places in Lori Province
Tiflis Governorate